This article contains a list of fossil-bearing stratigraphic units in the state of West Virginia, U.S.

Sites

See also

 Paleontology in West Virginia

References
 

West Virginia
Paleontology in West Virginia
Stratigraphy of West Virginia